Reventazón is a district of the Siquirres canton, in the Limón province of Costa Rica.

History 
Reventazón was created on 16 October 2018 by Decreto Ejecutivo N°040-2018-MGP.

Geography 
Reventazón has an elevation of  metres.

Demographics 

For the 2011 census, Reventazón had not been created, census data will be available in 2021.

Transportation

Road transportation 
The district is covered by the following road routes:
 National Route 806

References 

Districts of Limón Province
Populated places in Limón Province